Thomas McLain (19 January 1922 – December 1995) was an English professional footballer who played as a wing half for Sunderland.

References

1922 births
1995 deaths
People from Morpeth, Northumberland
Footballers from Northumberland
English footballers
Association football wing halves
Ashington A.F.C. players
Sunderland A.F.C. players
Northampton Town F.C. players
Oxford United F.C. players
Wellingborough Town F.C. players
English Football League players